Stuart Graham Cull-Candy  (born 2 November 1946) is a British neuroscientist. He holds the Gaddum Chair of Pharmacology and a personal Chair in Neuroscience at University College London. He is also a member of the Faculty of 1000 and holds a Royal Society - Wolfson Research position.

Early life and education
Cull-Candy was born on 2 November 1946 to Margaret and Stanley William Cull-Candy. He earned a Bachelor of Science degree in Zoology from Bedford College, London (now Royal Holloway, University of London), then a Master of Science degree from University College London (1969), and a PhD from the University of Glasgow in 1974.

Career and research
After working as a Royal Society Exchange Fellow at the University of Lund with Prof Stephen Thesleff, he held a Beit Memorial Research Fellowship in UCL's Biophysics Department with Sir Bernard Katz and Prof Ricardo Miledi. He was previously a Wellcome Trust Reader and then Professor of Pharmacology. 
He has been an Editorial Advisor to Nature, and served on the Editorial Boards of various journals including Neuron, The Journal of Physiology and as a Reviewing Editor on Journal of Neuroscience. Currently he is a member of the Royal Society University Research Fellowships Committee, and the Leverhulme Trust Senior Research Fellowships panel.

His research focuses on understanding molecular and functional properties of glutamate receptor channels underlying fast synaptic transmission in the brain. His research activities also include the study of ionotropic GABA and glutamate receptor signalling and regulation of neurotransmitter release. He has been a keen advocate of patch-clamp recording techniques combined with molecular methods for investigating central synaptic transmission.

Awards and honours
He was awarded the GL Brown Prize by the UK Physiological Society, and was appointed a Howard Hughes International Scholar in 1993 (one of only 20 in the UK). He was elected a Fellow of the Royal Society in 2002, and a Fellow of the Academy of Medical Sciences and the British Pharmacological Society.

References

1946 births
Living people
British neuroscientists
Electrophysiologists
Place of birth missing (living people)
Alumni of the University of Glasgow
Alumni of University College London
Academics of University College London